Aotearomyia is a genus of flies in the family Tabanidae.

Distribution
New Zealand.

Species
Aotearomyia adrel (Walker, 1850)
Aotearomyia brevipalpis (Kröber, 1931)
Aotearomyia lerda (Walker, 1850)
Aotearomyia milleri (Mackerras, 1957)
Aotearomyia montana (Hutton, 1901)
Aotearomyia ricardoae (Hutton, 1901)

References

Tabanidae
Brachycera genera
Diptera of Australasia
Endemic fauna of New Zealand
Endemic insects of New Zealand